La Grange is a home rule-class city in Oldham County, Kentucky, in the United States. The population was 10,067 at the time of the 2020 U.S. census. It is the seat of its county. An unusual feature of La Grange is the CSX Transportation street-running mainline track on Main Street.

History
La Grange was founded in 1827 when the Oldham County seat was relocated from Westport at the suggestion of Major William Berry Taylor. The new town was named for Château de la Grange-Bléneau, the French country estate of Gilbert du Motier, the American Revolutionary hero better known as the Marquis de Lafayette, who had visited the area in 1824. For unknown reasons, the county seat returned to Westport from 1828 to 1838 before settling at La Grange. The city was formally incorporated by the state legislature on January 23, 1840.

Geography
La Grange is located at  (38.406612, -85.379382).

Climate
The climate in this area is characterized by hot, humid summers and generally mild to cool winters.  According to the Köppen climate classification system, La Grange has a humid subtropical climate, Cfa on climate maps.

Demographics

As of the census of 2010, there were 8,082 people, 2,964 households, and 2,087 families residing in the city. The racial makeup of the city was 87.3% White (83.5% non-Hispanic), 4.7% African American, 0.27% Native American, 0.62% Asian, 0.16% Pacific Islander, 4.6% from other races, and 2.3% from two or more races. Hispanics or Latinos of any race were 8.9% of the population.

There were 2,964 households, out of which 43.1% had children under the age of 18 living with them, 49.9% were married couples living together, 15.5% had a single female householder, 5.1% had a single male householder, and 29.6% were non-families. 25.3% of all households were made up of individuals, and 11.5% had someone living alone who was 65 years of age or older. The average household size was 2.65 and the average family size was 3.17.

The age distribution was 29.8% under 18, 7.2% from 18 to 24, 30.4% from 25 to 44, 20.4% from 45 to 64, and 11.7% who were 65 or older. The median age was 33.8 years. For every 100 females, there were 92.7 males. For every 100 females age 18 and over, there were 86.6 males.

Correctional facilities
The Kentucky Department of Corrections maintains four correctional facilities in La Grange.  Construction began on the Kentucky State Reformatory, the largest prison in the state, in 1937, with the prison opening in 1939. Roederer Correctional Complex, which houses the Assessment and Classification Center where male inmates not sentenced to death enter the state prison system, was built in 1976. The Luther Luckett Correctional Complex and Kentucky Correctional Psychiatric Center, both built in the same facility but technically two separate prisons, opened in 1983. Approximately 4,000 inmates of various security levels are housed at these institutions.

Education
La Grange has a lending library, a branch of the Oldham County Public Library.

Arts and culture
The La Grange historic district contains numerous small businesses such as shops, eateries, and art galleries.

Discover Downtown La Grange is a nonprofit organization dedicated to promoting business, history, and community in the city.

La Grange hosts a Farmers and Artisan Market, a Kentucky Proud Market, where locally made items are sold. The market is open from mid-May through late October.

Notable people
 Tom Blankenship (aka Two Tone Tommy), bassist for My Morning Jacket
 William J. Crowe, former Chairman of the Joint Chiefs of Staff 
 Roland Isaacs, former NASCAR driver
 Robert Mallory, U.S. Representative from Kentucky
 Marvin H. McIntyre, secretary to President Franklin D. Roosevelt
 Buddy Pepper, former songwriter, pianist, composer, arranger, and actor

References

External links

 

Cities in Kentucky
Cities in Oldham County, Kentucky
County seats in Kentucky
Louisville metropolitan area
Populated places established in 1827
1827 establishments in Kentucky